Eelco is a given name. Notable people with the name include:

Eelco Gelling (born 1946), Dutch blues guitarist
Eelco Horsten (born 1989), Dutch professional footballer
Eelco Jansen (born 1969), Dutch baseball player
Eelco Sintnicolaas (born 1987), Dutch athlete, specialising in the decathlon
Eelco van Asperen (1965–2013), Dutch computer scientist
Eelco van Kleffens (1894–1983), politician and diplomat of The Netherlands

Dutch masculine given names